The 2013 Vuelta a España began on 24 August, and stage 11 occurred on 4 September. The 2013 edition began with a team time trial stage – where each member of a team started together racing against the clock – in Vilanova de Arousa with the second stage unusually a mountain stage. The eleventh stage, after the first rest day, is the only individual time trial of the race.

Stage 1
24 August 2013 — Vilanova de Arousa to Sanxenxo, team time trial (TTT)

For the fourth year in succession, the Vuelta began with a team time trial.

Stage 2
25 August 2013 — Pontevedra to Baiona–Alto do Monte da Groba,

Stage 3
26 August 2013 — Vigo to Mirador de Lobeira–Vilagarcía de Arousa,

Stage 4
27 August 2013 — Lalín–A Estrada to Fisterra–Etapa Fin del Mundo,

Stage 5
28 August 2013 — Sober to Lago de Sanabria,

Stage 6
29 August 2013 — Guijuelo to Cáceres,

Stage 7
30 August 2013 — Almendralejo to Mairena del Aljarafe,

Stage 8
31 August 2013 — Jerez de la Frontera to Estepona–Alto Peñas Blancas,

Stage 9
1 September 2013 — Antequera to Valdepeñas de Jaén,

Stage 10
2 September 2013 — Torredelcampo to Güéjar Sierra–Alto Hazallanas,

Stage 11
4 September 2013 — Tarazona to Tarazona, individual time trial (ITT)

Notes

References

2013 Vuelta a España
Vuelta a España stages